Zsolt Petry (born 23 September 1966) is a Hungarian former professional football who played as a goalkeeper and works as goalkeeping coach.

Criticism 
On 5 April 2021, Petry was heavily criticised on social media for homophobic and anti-immigrant statements he made in an interview in Hungarian newspaper Magyar Nemzet. The following day Hertha BSC fired him from his position as goalkeeping coach, stating that his remarks were incompatible with the club's values.

References

External links
 
 Zsolt Petry at eintracht-archiv.de

1966 births
Living people
Hungarian footballers
Association football goalkeepers
Hungary youth international footballers
Hungary international footballers
Nemzeti Bajnokság I players
Belgian Pro League players
Süper Lig players
Veikkausliiga players
MTK Budapest FC players
Fehérvár FC players
Budapest Honvéd FC players
K.A.A. Gent players
Gençlerbirliği S.K. footballers
R. Charleroi S.C. players
Feyenoord players
Eintracht Frankfurt players
Kotkan Työväen Palloilijat players
Dunaújváros FC players
SV Babelsberg 03 players
SC Paderborn 07 players
Association football goalkeeping coaches
Hungarian expatriate footballers
Hungarian expatriate sportspeople in the Netherlands
Expatriate footballers in the Netherlands
Hungarian expatriate sportspeople in Belgium
Expatriate footballers in Belgium
Hungarian expatriate sportspeople in Turkey
Expatriate footballers in Turkey
Hungarian expatriate sportspeople in Finland
Expatriate footballers in Finland
Hungarian expatriate sportspeople in Germany
Expatriate footballers in Germany
Footballers from Budapest